The Mercedes-Benz CLA class is a series of luxury compact executive cars manufactured by Mercedes-Benz since 2013. The first generation was a four-door sedan based on the platform of the W176 A-Class and W246 B-Class compact cars, marketed as a four-door coupé. In 2015, Mercedes-Benz expanded the CLA family to include the Shooting Brake, a station wagon configuration. As the V177 A-Class sedan took its place as the budget-conscious sedan, the second generation got longer and wider than the W205 C-Class.

The CLA is Mercedes-Benz's first front-wheel drive vehicle offered in the North American market. The CLA range is positioned above the A-Class and it is nearly on the level of the C-Class in the Mercedes model range, and models tend to be less practical than the A-Class it is based on.

The CLA first went on sale in Europe in April 2013, and was subsequently introduced in the United States in September 2013. Its largest markets are Western Europe and the United States. Global cumulative CLA sales reached 100,000 during its first year, cited as "our best launch in 20 years" by Mercedes-Benz. Worldwide, Mercedes-Benz sold about 750,000 units of the first generation.

First generation (C117; 2013)

Development and launch
The design of the C117 CLA is based on the Concept Style Coupe concept unveiled by Mercedes-Benz at the 2012 Avant/Garde Diaries event in Los Angeles, followed by the 2012 Auto China, and Huashan 1914 Creative Park. It is a four-door fastback coupe, based on the platform of the W176 A-Class and W246 B-Class compact cars. The production version C117 CLA was publicly unveiled at the 2013 North American International Auto Show, with sales commencing in September 2013.

Trial production of the CLA at the Kecskemét plant at southeast of Budapest, Hungary started in 2012, with production at Kecskemét plant beginning in January 2013.

The C117 CLA was at the time the most affordable Mercedes-Benz vehicle offered for sale in the United States, with a base price of $29,900 (2014). This undercut the C-Class, the vehicle it replaced as the entry-level sedan in Mercedes-Benz line-up of cars, which started at $38,200 (2014). The C117 CLA was also the first front-wheel drive vehicle ever offered by Mercedes-Benz in the U.S. market.

The 2015 model included updated infotainment with a bigger central screen and an updated head unit with iPhone interface as standard, Collision Prevention Assist Plus autonomous braking made standard and an extra 5 kW for the CLA 220 CDI. Furthermore, the 2016 model brought Carplay as an option to the CLA. A facelift was introduced for the CLA model range in 2017, offering new restyled headlights and restyled taillights with available bold LED lighting.

Initial release

CLA Edition 1 (2013–2015)
Available in CLA 180, CLA 200, CLA 250, CLA 220 CDI, they are versions of the respective CLA models with a choice of five body colours: mountain grey, cosmos black, night black, cirrus white or designo polar silver magno (expected to be available from the third quarter of 2013). The Edition 1 features AMG front and rear aprons, AMG side sill panels, black painted multi-spoke AMG light-alloy wheels, diamond-style radiator grille with black fin and chrome inserts, bi-xenon headlamps, lowered sports suspension, exclusive NEON ART interior, sports seats upholstered in leather and black microfibre DINAMICA with yellow stitching, instrument panel and the beltlines upholstered in ARTICO man-made leather with yellow stitching, trim elements in aluminium with a light longitudinal grain, and a three-spoke multifunction sports steering wheel with a flattened bottom section and perforations in the grip area. The vehicles went on sale for the twelve months after the launch of CLA vehicles.

CLA 180 BlueEFFICIENCY Edition (2013–2019)
It is a version of CLA 180 with reduced fuel consumption. Drag coefficient value was reduced to 0.22 via low A-pillar shoulder with adapted A-pillar geometry, aerodynamically optimised exterior mirror housings and rear shape, optimised diffuser, optimised underbody and rear axle panelling, radiator shutter, aero wheel trims and serrated wheel spoilers on the front and rear wheel arches. The vehicle was set to go on sale in September 2013.

Mercedes-Benz Sport Equipment CLA 200 concept (2013)
It is a version of Mercedes-Benz CLA 200 demonstrating Mercedes-Benz Accessories GmbH equipment for the CLA. It included "Road & Track" decal kit (number '1' decal at front door and hood, decorative stripe in red/grey runs along the centre of the car), carbon fibre-style exterior mirror housings, front apron spoiler lip and rear spoiler; red-painted brake callipers, Styling Package Night (black window surrounds, black shoulderline trip strips), 18-inch two-tone 5-twin-spoke light-alloy wheels in matt black with red rim flange, Sport badge at front wings, illuminated door sill panels with Sport lettering, a leather sports steering wheel, sports pedals in brushed stainless steel, Sport floor mats Drive Kit Plus. The vehicles were unveiled in 2013 Frankfurt International Motor Show.

Shooting Brake (2015–2019)

Mercedes-Benz announced the X117 CLA Shooting Brake at the 2014 LA Auto Show, which is a five-door station wagon version of the CLA sedan. It measures in at the same length as the CLA sedan and also shares the same wheelbase. It was not sold in the United States.

The only visual changes start from the B-pillar, which provides more headroom in the backseat area. It also provides more boot space than the sedan, 470 litres to 495 litres, while folding the rear seats flat frees a usable 1354 litres.

Technical details

Engines
All CLA models are powered by four-cylinder engines, including a choice of 1.6 L and 2.0 L gasoline, and 3 diesels, a 1.5L, a 1.8 L and a 2.2 L. Most of the engines come in a range of different states of tuning, and all include a stop-start feature.

*With optional extra-cost AMG Driver's Package.

**(sold only in states LA, TX) Optional package, not base model.

***The designation "d" replaces "CDI" on all diesel models from 2015 onwards.

Transmissions

The 7G-DCT transmission includes electric activation of the hydraulics for the parking lock, which is locked by mechanical means; three gearshift programs (ECONOMY, SPORT, MANUAL). 7G-DCT transmission option became available for CLA 180 in June 2013, followed by CLA 200 CDI in September 2013.

AMG models

Mercedes-AMG CLA 45 (2013–2018)

The Mercedes-AMG CLA 45 (previously Mercedes-Benz CLA 45 AMG) is a current high-performance model of the CLA from Mercedes-AMG. The car shares its drivetrain with the A45 AMG, and it features an AMG M133 2.0-litre four-cylinder twin-scroll turbocharged petrol engine, 4MATIC all wheel drive, SPEEDSHIFT DCT 7-speed transmission with paddle shifters, AMG sports suspension with independently developed front and rear axles, electromechanical AMG speed-sensitive sports steering, AMG high-performance braking system, three-stage ESP with "SPORT Handling" mode. Other features include AMG "twin-blade" radiator grille in matt titanium grey, AMG front fascia with front splitter in matt titanium grey, Large side cooling air intakes with black flics, Side sill panels with inserts in matt titanium grey, "TURBO AMG" lettering on front wing, AMG rear fascia with stylised side air outlet openings, Rear diffuser insert with trim in matt titanium grey, AMG sports exhaust system with two rectangular chrome-plated tailpipe trims featuring twin-tailpipe design, Bi-xenon headlamps, Tail lights with LED technology, Red seat belts, sports seats in ARTICO man-made leather/DINAMICA microfibre with red contrasting topstitching and red seat belts, the multifunction sports steering wheel with shift paddles, and the AMG DRIVE UNIT with E-SELECT lever, instrument panel trim in brushed aluminium and five galvanised ventilation outlets, central colour display incorporates the AMG main menu including RACETIMER.

The AMG M133 2.0 twin-scroll turbocharged 4-cylinder found in the range-topping CLA 45 AMG is the world’s most powerful production 4-cylinder engine.

The vehicle was unveiled in the 2013 Geneva Motor Show, followed by the 2013 New York International Auto Show. It went on sale in late September 2013.

For the 2016 year model, Mercedes-AMG increased the horsepower of the CLA 45. New features that were added include AMG DYNAMIC SELECT and an introduction to AMG DYNAMIC PLUS package which brings enhanced acceleration, suspension, and transmission.

CLA 45 AMG Edition 1 (2014)
The Edition 1 model includes Night package, red accents on the radiator grille and exterior mirrors, and AMG sports stripes in matt graphite grey above the side sill panels; optional Intelligent Light System includes red accents on the headlamps, AMG multi-spoke alloy wheels in matt black with special AMG hub caps featuring a centre-locking look, red brake callipers, 8 x 19 alloy wheels with 235/35 R 19 tyres, spoiler lip in high-gloss black on the boot lid, choice of 2 standard (cirrus white, night black) and 4 optional (cosmos black metallic, mountain grey metallic, polar silver metallic, designo polar silver magno) body colours.

CLA 45 AMG Racing Series (2013)
This is a race car version of the CLA 45 AMG for the CLA 45 AMG Racing Series, with carbon-fiber reinforced plastics doors. The vehicle was unveiled in the 2013 Frankfurt International Motor Show.

CLA 45 AMG 4matic AMG 50th Anniversary Edition (2017)
To celebrate the 50th anniversary of AMG, Mercedes-Benz Korea launched a 50-unit limited edition of the CLA 45 AMG. It was fitted with 'AMG Aerodynamic package' in stock condition. Externally, it had a Cosmos Black interior color with matte gray AMG stripes across the hood and the doors. They also gave yellow highlights, such as the side mirrors, wheels, and the bottom part of the front, rear, and back side of the car. In the interior, it was finished with black colored alcantara and leather, and gave yellow highlights like the exterior, such as the air vents,dashboard, and floor mats. It also had AMG  performance seats and Harman/Kardon Logic7 stereo system as stock.

Safety

Euro NCAP

The CLA achieved the best possible rating of five stars for occupant safety, pedestrian protection and assistance systems in the demanding Euro NCAP assessment scheme. The CLA comes standard with a number of safety systems like Collision Prevention Assist, Attention Assist, Adaptive braking technology, Daytime Running Lamps and Rain-sensing windshield wipers. The CLA also received three "Euro NCAP Advanced" rewards for these safety innovations, including the radar-assisted second-generation Collision Prevention Assist, the Attention Assist drowsiness detection system and the anticipatory occupant protection system Pre-Safe (optional equipment). Mercedes-Benz upgraded the safety systems for the 2015 CLA with even more of the latest technology, this includes the Collision Prevention Assist Plus, which helps to reduce the risk of rear-end collisions, and also upgraded the Attention Assist and Traffic Sign Assist (with Speed Limit Assist) systems.

Second generation (C118; 2019)

The second generation CLA was unveiled at the 2019 Consumer Electronics Show in January 2019. Based on the same Modular Front Architecture (MFA2) platform as the W177 A-Class, W247 B-Class, X247 GLB and H247 GLA the C118 CLA retains the fastback styling to set it apart from the V177 A-Class Sedan and shares its powertrains with the A-Class. Stylistically, the design is inspired by the new design language Mercedes-Benz adopted for the C257 CLS.

The C118 has an almost completely flat underbody, resulting in a drag coefficient as low as 0.23. It uses front MacPherson struts in combination with either a twist beam or multi-link at the rear, and the option of adaptive dampers.

All models feature the Mercedes-Benz User Experience (MBUX) infotainment system, including the "Hey Mercedes" voice-controlled assistant and a new Interior Assist gesture control system. Standard models feature two 7-inch displays for the instrument cluster and MBUX screen, and can be upgraded to 10.25-inch screens, a full-color head-up display, adaptive cruise control, active steering assist, and active brake assist.

The X118 CLA Shooting Brake was unveiled at the 2019 Geneva Auto Show. It has 505 litres of boot space, 10 L more than the outgoing model and 45 L more than the standard CLA. Like its predecessor, the CLA Shooting Brake has a drag coefficient of 0.26. However, the CLA Shooting Brake will not be sold in the United States and Australia.

The AMG CLA35 model was unveiled at the 2019 New York International Auto Show. It uses an all-wheel drive layout and has a 7-speed dual clutch AMG SpeedShift DCT transmission. The range-performing variants AMG CLA45 and CLA45 S were unveiled at the 2019 Goodwood Festival of Speed. They both uses an all-wheel drive system that can also split torque between the rear wheels via separate clutches and has a 8-speed dual clutch AMG SpeedShift DCT transmission. The AMG variants are also available in the Shooting Brake configuration. The range-performing variants AMG CLA35 4MATIC and CLA45 S 4MATIC+ were unveiled at the 2020 in Thailand. They are imported from Hungary and the AMG variants are also available in the coupe configuration.

The CLA 250 e plug-in hybrid variant was revealed in March 2020; it is available in both Coupe and Shooting Brake body styles.

The vehicle will receive a facelift for the 2023 model year.

Technical details

Engines

Transmissions

Marketing
As part of the first generation CLA US product launch, a television commercial featuring Kate Upton was produced for, and premiered during the 4th quarter of Super Bowl XLVII. Additional commercials titled 'Dishes', 'Jukebox', 'Sundae' were premiered during Super Bowl XLVII. A TV commercial titled 'Soul', featuring a devil played by Willem Dafoe was also premiered during Super Bowl XLVII.

In a promotional campaign under the slogan "Untamed. The new CLA", a TV commercial titled 'Wolf' asks how it is possible to stand out from the crowd, when so many others are also striving for individuality – the answer is provided by the new CLA. The commercial was premiered until mid-March 2013 on all major German TV channels. The print materials show the 'style rebel' from a range of perspectives, which had appeared until mid-April 2013 in high-circulation news and business magazines, specialist motoring publications and special interest media under headings such as "Form: non-conformist" or "Untamed".

The #Untamed was launched in February 2013, a digital photo installation inspired by the new Mercedes-Benz CLA, for which Mercedes-Benz will be exploiting the power of the popular social media photo platform Instagram. Users could to go to www.untamed-installation.com and upload the most unusual images from their personal Instagram photo stream to the multivdevice-compatible CLA campaign website. On the homepage, participants can see how individual their photos are, and the extent to which they stand out from the images captured by other participants. In accordance with the central theme of "The natural enemy of the ordinary", participants are encouraged to break free from the constraints of convention and demonstrate their creativity. A poster of the personal pictures can then be downloaded, sent by email or shared with friends via Facebook, Google+ and Twitter. Began in April 2013, these personal photos were digitally reworked and, together with the CLA, incorporated into an actual photo installation, to be presented to an international audience in Paris.

The AMG CLA 45 first made its video game appearance in the 2014 PlayStation 4 video game Driveclub.

Reception
The CLA has been a controversial vehicle among Mercedes-Benz fans in North America due to its many differences from other Mercedes-Benz models. In contrast to most Mercedes models sold in the U.S., the CLA is small, based on a front-wheel drive platform, and powered exclusively by four-cylinder engines. Labeled by Mercedes-Benz as a new "gateway" into the Mercedes-Benz brand with sales "beyond our optimistic expectations", Consumer Reports rated the CLA as "140% worse than the average car" in the 2014 Annual Auto Reliability Survey.

Despite the criticism, the CLA received praise worldwide from professional reviewers. The price, which starts from $30,000, has been the highlight for many reviewers. The front-wheel drive has been praised for giving the CLA a better fuel economy, which gives especially the CLA 250 a 26 mpg in the city and 38 mpg on the road. The coupe-like handling has been praised, which has been described as "quick and direct". The interior has been praised for making the CLA a more "youthful choice". Though the CLA is an entry level car, professional reviewers agree that it still looks and feels like a proper Mercedes.

Sales

References

External links

 Official website

CLA-Class
Cars introduced in 2013
2020s cars
Compact cars
Sedans
Station wagons
Front-wheel-drive vehicles
All-wheel-drive vehicles